Transit Driver Appreciation Day is an annual event to celebrate the public service of public transit vehicle operators. The date of March 18 was selected to commemorate the first bus line, Blaise Pascal's Carrosses à cinq sols in Paris, 1662.

Observing Agencies

 Massachusetts Bay Transportation Authority
Tri-County Metropolitan Transportation District of Oregon
 King County Metro
City of Winnipeg Transit System
Brampton Transit
Sun Tran of Tucson, Arizona
Corpus Christi Regional Transportation Authority
Hill Country Transit District
Community Transit

History
In 2009, Hans Gerwitz and Shannon E. Thomas published a blog post calling for a Bus Driver Appreciation Day. That year it was publicized by local transit-oriented blogs in Seattle, Virginia, and Washington, D.C.

For the 2013 observance, Portland's TriMet established busdriverday.org.

By 2014, TriMet included rail operators by changing the name of Bus Driver Appreciation Day to Transit Driver Appreciation Day. Their site migrated to transitdriverday.org and the Amalgamated Transit Union began publicly observing the day with the new name. This fostered extensive recognition throughout North America.

See also
 Public transport

References

External links
 Transit Driver Appreciation Day
 Slate, Bus Driver Appreciation Day: A Fitting Tribute To One Of The Most Stressful Jobs In The World, 26 Jan 2011
 KBCS Radio, Unmute the Commute: Transit Driver Appreciation Day, 17 March 2017

March observances
Unofficial observances